Soccer Bowl '75 was the championship final of the 1975 NASL season, played between the Tampa Bay Rowdies and the Portland Timbers.  The match took place on August 24, 1975 at Spartan Stadium, in San Jose, California.  It was the first North American Soccer League championship to be known as the Soccer Bowl. The Tampa Bay Rowdies won the match, 2–0, to claim their first North American championship. This was the third consecutive year that an expansion team won the NASL title.

Background

Tampa Bay Rowdies

The Tampa Bay Rowdies qualified for the playoffs by virtue of winning the Eastern Division with 135 points. The point total earned them the number 2 seed and the right to host all preliminary rounds of the playoffs. The Rowdies defeated the Toronto Metros-Croatia in the quarterfinal match, 1–0, on August 13, 1975. Three days later they dispatched the Miami Toros, 3–0, in their semifinal game played on August 16, 1975, to advance to the finals.

Portland Timbers

The Portland Timbers qualified for the playoffs by virtue of winning the Western Division with 138 points. The point total earned them the number 1 seed and the right to host all preliminary rounds of the playoffs. The Timbers defeated the Seattle Sounders in the quarterfinal match, 2–1, in sudden death overtime on August 12, 1975. Five days later they beat the St. Louis Stars, 1–0, in a semifinal game played on August 17, 1975, to advance to the finals.

Match details 

1975 NASL Champions: Tampa Bay Rowdies
Television: CBS
Announcers: Frank Glieber, Jack Whitaker

Match statistics

See also 
 1975 North American Soccer League season

References

External links
 

1975
 
1975
August 1975 sports events in the United States
1975 in sports in California
Soccer in California
Sports competitions in San Jose, California